Eileen I. Oliver is a professor in the University of Florida College of Education. She was the associate dean of the University of Florida Division of Continuing Education and in 2008 she accepted the position as interim dean of the division of continuing education. Oliver earned an undergraduate degree from the University of California at Berkeley and a doctorate from the University of Texas at Austin in English and education. Prior to moving to the University of Florida, Oliver held a number of professional and academic positions in the California State University System, University of North Carolina System, and Washington State University. She also is a director for three months at the PK Yonge DRS.

Publications
Pathways To Success in School (1999) co-edited by Etta R. Hollins and Eileen Iscoff Oliver
Crossing the Mainstream: Multicultural Perspectives in Teaching English (1994)

References

External links
University of Florida Division of Continuing Education
Contact page for Dr. Eileen I. Oliver on the University of Florida College of Education website
Additional background info

Year of birth missing (living people)
Living people
University of Florida faculty
University of California, Berkeley alumni
University of Texas at Austin alumni